The 2010 Baylor Bears football team represented Baylor University in the 2010 NCAA Division I FBS football season. The team was coached by Art Briles and played their home games at Floyd Casey Stadium in Waco, Texas. They are members of the Big 12 Conference in the South Division. They finished the season 7–6, 4–4 in Big 12 play and were invited to the Texas Bowl, their first bowl appearance since 1994, where they were defeated by Illinois 14–38.  This season featured BU's first win over the University of Texas since 1997, and the first in Austin since 1991 (12 straight losses, the most recent 11 losses all by at least 21 points).

Schedule

Rankings

References

Baylor
Baylor Bears football seasons
Baylor Bears football